Harry Turberville Smith-Turberville (18 January 1848 – 28 July 1934) was an English first-class cricketer.

Smith-Turberville was born Harry Turberville Smith at Westminster in January 1848. He changed his name in November 1884.

He made his debut in first-class cricket for the Marylebone Cricket Club (MCC) against Derbyshire at Lord's in 1886. Batting twice in the match, Smith-Turberville was dismissed for 10 runs in the MCC first-innings by William Cropper, while in their second-innings he was dismissed by George Walker. He toured the West Indies with R. S. Lucas' XI in 1894–95, featuring in a single first-class match on the tour against Trinidad at Port of Spain. Again batting twice in the match, he was dismissed for 11 runs in the R. S. Lucas' XI first-innings by Float Woods, while ending their second-innings not out on 6. He also took a single wicket in Trinidad's second-innings, dismissing Lebrun Constantine to finish with figures of 1 for 28 from eight overs. 

He married Emma "Queenie" Nevill in London in January 1885. He wrote a 68-page cricketing memoir, Peeps into the Past, in 1917. He died at Hove in July 1934.

References

External links

1848 births
1934 deaths
People from Westminster
English cricketers
Marylebone Cricket Club cricketers
R. S. Lucas' XI cricketers